NTN may refer to:

NTN (TV channel), Ukraine
NTN Buzztime, an entertainment company
NTN Corporation, bearing manufacturer
National Terminal Number
New Telemark Norm, a type of ski binding
Newton railway station, station code "NTN"
Nike Team Nationals, a cross-country meet
Normanton Airport, IATA airport code "NTN"

Science
Netrins or NTN1, class of proteins
Neurotactin, protein now known as CX3CL1
Neurturin, glial protein